Cameron Harry Wilson (born 1 December 2002) is an English professional footballer who plays as an attacking midfielder or right winger for  club Scunthorpe United.

Career
Born in Scunthorpe, Wilson played youth football for Goole Town Tigers before joining Scunthorpe United's under-11 team in 2013. He signed his first professional contract with the club in May 2021; he signed a one-year deal with the option of a further year. He made his debut for the club as a substitute in a 3–1 home defeat to Swindon Town on 7 August 2021.

On 6 January 2022, Wilson joined Northern Premier League Premier Division side Scarborough Athletic on a one-month loan deal. The deal was later extended until the end of the season. Wilson was recalled to Scunthorpe on 13 April 2022, he made 17 league appearances for Scarborough and scored twice. Wilson immediately returned to the Scunthorpe side and made his first league start for the club in a 1-1 draw against Stevenage on 18 April 2022. At the end of the 2021–22 season, Wilson's contract was extended for a further year.

Style of play
Wilson plays predominantly as an attacking midfielder or right winger.

Career statistics

References

External links

2002 births
Living people
English footballers
Sportspeople from Scunthorpe
Footballers from Lincolnshire
Association football midfielders
Association football wingers
Scunthorpe United F.C. players
Scarborough Athletic F.C. players
Northern Premier League players
English Football League players